{{Automatic taxobox
| taxon = Eosiphonidae
| image = Thermosipho desbruyeresi (MNHN-IM-2012-19771).jpeg
| image_caption = Shell of Enigmaticolus desbruyeresi (specimen at MNHN, Paris)
| authority = Kantor, Fedosov, Kosyan, Puillandre, Sorokin, Kano, R. Clark & Bouchet, 2021
| synonyms_ref = 
| synonyms = 
| subdivision_ranks = Genera
| subdivision = See text
|display_parents= 3
}}

The Eosiphonidae are a  taxonomic family of large sea snails, often known as whelks and the like.

Genera
 Americominella Klappenbach & Ureta, 1972
 Calagrassor Kantor, Puillandre, Fraussen, Fedosov & Bouchet, 2013
 Eclectofusus Fraussen & Stahlschmidt, 2013
 Enigmaticolus Fraussen, 2008
 Eosipho Thiele, 1929
 Gaillea Kantor, Puillandre, Fraussen, Fedosov & Bouchet, 2013
 Manaria E. A. Smith, 1906
 Preangeria K. Martin, 1921
 Thermosipho Kantor, Puillandre, Fraussen, Fedosov & Bouchet, 2013
 Warenius'' Kantor, Kosyan, Sorokin, Herbert & Fedosov, 2020

References

External links
 Kantor, Y.I., Fedosov, A.E., Kosyan, A.R., Puillandre, N., Sorokin, P.A., Kano, Y., Clark, R. N. & Bouchet, P. (2022 (nomenclatural availability: 2021)). Molecular phylogeny and revised classification of the Buccinoidea (Neogastropoda). Zoological Journal of the Linnean Society. 194: 789-857

Buccinoidea